The 1997 Newsweek Champions Cup and the State Farm Evert Cup were tennis tournaments played on outdoor hard courts that were part of the Mercedes Super 9 of the 1997 ATP Tour and of Tier I of the 1997 WTA Tour. Both the men's and women's events took place at the Grand Champions Resort in Indian Wells, California in the United States from March 7 through March 16, 1997.

Finals

Men's singles

 Michael Chang defeated  Bohdan Ulihrach 4–6, 6–3, 6–4, 6–3
 It was Chang's 2nd title of the year and the 28th of his career. It was his 1st Masters title of the year and his 7th overall. It was also his 3rd title at the event after winning in 1992 and 1996.

Women's singles

 Lindsay Davenport defeated  Irina Spîrlea 6–2, 6–1
 It was Davenport's 3rd title of the year and the 21st of her career. It was her 1st Tier I title.

Men's doubles

 Mark Knowles /  Daniel Nestor defeated  Mark Philippoussis /  Patrick Rafter 7–6, 4–6, 7–5
 It was Knowles' 1st title of the year and the 10th of his career. It was Nestor's 1st title of the year and the 7th of his career.

Women's doubles

 Lindsay Davenport /  Natasha Zvereva defeated  Lisa Raymond /  Nathalie Tauziat 6–3, 6–2
 It was Davenport's 4th title of the year and the 22nd of her career. It was Zvereva's 3rd title of the year and the 65th of her career.

References

External links
 
 Association of Tennis Professionals (ATP) tournament profile
 WTA Tournament Profile

Newsweek Champions Cup
State Farm Evert Cup
Indian Wells Masters
Newsweek Champions Cup and the State Farm Evert Cup
Newsweek
Newsweek Champions Cup and the State Farm Evert Cup